Anders Carlsson may refer to:
 Anders Carlsson (ice hockey)
 Anders Carlsson (politician)
 Anders Carlsson (sport shooter)

See also
 Anders Carlson (disambiguation)